Pettoranello del Molise is a comune (municipality) in the Province of Isernia in the Italian region Molise, located about  west of Campobasso and about  southeast of Isernia.

Pettoranello del Molise borders the following municipalities: Carpinone, Castelpetroso, Castelpizzuto, Isernia, Longano.

Twin towns
  Princeton Township,   United States.

References

Cities and towns in Molise

la:Pectoranum (Campania)